Gossas Department is one of the departments of Senegal, located in the Fatick Region on the west coast.

Administrative divisions
Within the department lies one commune, the town of Gossas.

The rural districts (communautés rurales) comprise:

 Arrondissement of Colobane:
 
 
 Arrondissement of Ouadiour:

Historic sites

Gossas commune
 Mausoleum of Serigne Khar Kane
 Mausoleum of Ndamal Gossas (Oumar Guèye)

Gossas département
 Site of Battle of Danki 
 Wells of Ndiéné
 Bivouac of El Hadj Umar Tall (Badakhoune)
 Fetishist trees of Gagnick Godjil
 Gouye Ndiouly baobab tree at Kahone, near Kaolack
 Island of Kouyong Keïta, opposite Kahone
 Backwaters of Ngaby and Wagui (Badakhoune)

References

Departments of Senegal
Fatick Region